1969 UC Davis Aggies football team represented the University of California, Davis as a member of the Far Western Conference (FWC) during the 1969 NCAA College Division football season. Led by Herb Schmalenberger in his seventh and final season as head coach, the Aggies compiled an overall record of 3–7 with a mark of 0–5 in conference play, placing last out of six teams in the FWC. The team was outscored by its opponents 258 to 192 for the season. The Aggies played home games at Toomey Field in Davis, California.

In the seven years under Schmalenberger, the Aggies compiled an overall record of 28–38, for a winning percentage of .424. Schmalenberger was also the head coach of the swimming team for five seasons, from 1957 to 1962, and the basketball team for one season, in 1957–58, at the school.

The UC Davis sports teams were commonly called the "Cal Aggies" from 1924 until the mid 1970s.

Schedule

NFL Draft
The following UC Davis Aggies players were selected in the 1970 NFL Draft.

References

UC Davis
UC Davis Aggies football seasons
UC Davis Aggies football